Lamela may refer to
Lamela (surname)
Lamela, Zenica, a residential building in Bosnia and Herzegovina
Estudio Lamela, a Spanish firm of architecture